Tekel Birası is a Turkish beer brand. Having first been brewed in Bomonti, Istanbul in 1890, it is known as the oldest brewery brand in the country.

Tekel Birası was a state monopoly brand until 2004. Following the privatisation, the era of Tekel state monopoly has ended and now production is under control of a private company called MEY.

See also 
 List of food companies

External links
Tekel Beer Official site

Beer in Turkey
Food and drink companies established in 1890
Turkish brands
1890 establishments in the Ottoman Empire
Economy of Istanbul